The 1958 Paris–Roubaix was the 56th edition of the Paris–Roubaix, a classic one-day cycle race in France. The single day event was held on 13 April 1958 and stretched  from Paris to the finish at Roubaix Velodrome. The winner was Leon Vandaele from Belgium.

Results

References

1958
1958 in road cycling
1958 in French sport
1958 Challenge Desgrange-Colombo
1958 in Paris
April 1958 sports events in Europe